Al-Farisi (lit. "the Persian") is a surname. Notable people with the surname include:

 Salman al-Farisi (died 653 AD), a companion of the Islamic prophet Muhammad and the first Persian who converted to Islam.
 Kamāl al-Dīn al-Fārisī (died 1319 AD), optician and mathematician
 Muhammad ibn Abi Bakr al‐Farisi (died 1278/1279 AD), astronomer born in Aden and author of al-Tuḥfa

Nisbas